Fahrenkrog is a German surname. Notable people with the surname include:

Joy Fahrenkrog (born 1979), American archer
Ludwig Fahrenkrog (1867–1952), German painter, illustrator, sculptor, and writer

See also
Jörn-Uwe Fahrenkrog-Petersen (born 1960), German musician

Low German surnames